Lower Macedonia (Kato Makedonia) or Macedonia proper or Emathia is a geographical term used in Antiquity referring to the coastal plain watered by the rivers Haliacmon, Axius on the west and bounded by Strymon on the east. Its districts were: Pieria, Bottiaea, Emathia, Crestonia, Mygdonia and Bisaltia. There were also included the subregions  Anthemous and Crousis in it which were originally part of Chalcidice but were annexed earlier. The region corresponds roughly to the modern Greek region of Central Macedonia, except for the Chalcidice peninsula.

The center and two capitals (Aigai and Pella) of the ancient Macedonian Kingdom lay in Emathia and Bottiaea respectively, from where the Macedonians conquered gradually the Thracian-inhabited areas east of the Axius in the 5th and 4th centuries BC. For this reason the regions of Edonis, Sintice, Odomantis and Pieris, conquered by Philip II, were termed in Latin Macedonia Adjecta (Επίκτητος Μακεδονία).

See also
Upper Macedonia
Ancient Greek geography
 History of Macedonia (ancient kingdom)

Sources
A Manual of Ancient Geography. by Heinrich Kiepert, George Augustin. Macmillan. p 182 
The Greek World in the Fourth Century. by Lawrence A. Tritle. p 167 
The Classical Gazetteer. Hazlitt. p 210

External links
Map of the growth of Macedonia 4th BC - Lower Macedonia is shown in brown - Retrieved from Eliznik. com.

 
Geography of ancient Macedonia
Macedonia
Macedonia (ancient kingdom)